Baba Zünnun rebellion, Baba Zünnun was an Alevi who struck the palace of Lord Mustafa of the sandjak of Bozok in August, 1526 and revolted with his troops. After this he encountered troops who were sent to crush the revolt, but Baba Zünnun won. Hürrem Paşa, Berham Bey of the sanjak of Kayseri and Ali bey of the sanjak of İçel died during this battle.

Baba Zünnun was killed after the attack of Pîrî Bey.

References
 

Rebellions in the Ottoman Empire
1526 in the Ottoman Empire